Dean Colton (born 18 February 1983) is a former Scotland international rugby league footballer who played in the 2000s and 2010s.

Background
Dean Colton was born in Doncaster, South Yorkshire, England.

Playing career
Dean Colton made his début for Doncaster in 2001. He played 10 of his 11-year career at Doncaster, spending one season with Featherstone Rovers in 2007. Dean Colton made his début for Featherstone Rovers on Sunday 18 March 2007, and he played his last match for Featherstone Rovers during 2007. He announced his retirement in 2012.

He represented Scotland in the 2008 Rugby League World Cup, playing once and scoring a try in the 18–36 defeat by France.

References

External links
 
 
 

1983 births
Living people
Doncaster R.L.F.C. players
English rugby league players
Featherstone Rovers players
Rugby league centres
Rugby league wingers
Rugby league players from Doncaster
Scotland national rugby league team players